The women's 400 metres hurdles at the 2012 World Junior Championships in Athletics was held at the Estadi Olímpic Lluís Companys on 12, 13, and 14 July.

Medalists

Records
, the existing world junior and championship records were as follows.

Results

Heats

Qualification: first 4 of each heat (Q) plus the 4 fastest times (q) qualified

Semi-final
Qualification: The first 2 of each heat (Q) and the 2 fastest times (q) qualified

Final

Participation
According to an unofficial count, 36 athletes from 26 countries participated in the event.

References

External links
WJC12 400 metres hurdles schedule

400 metres hurdles
400 metres hurdles at the World Athletics U20 Championships
2012 in women's athletics